The 1925 Akron football team was an American football team that represented the University of Akron in the Ohio Athletic Conference (OAC) during the 1925 college football season. In its second season under head coach James W. Coleman, the team compiled a 1–7 record (1–6 against conference opponents) and was outscored by a total of 150 to 17. Joseph Schoch was the team captain.

Schedule

References

Akron
Akron Zips football seasons
Akron football